Lefferts Boulevard is a major north–south thoroughfare in Queens, New York City, running through the communities of Kew Gardens, Richmond Hill, and South Ozone Park. Its northern end is at Kew Gardens Road, in Kew Gardens, and its southern end is located within John F. Kennedy International Airport. Lefferts Boulevard intersects with other major roads such as Metropolitan Avenue, Jamaica Avenue, and Atlantic Avenue. It is 119th Street for its entire run.

Transportation

The road is also served by New York City's extensive public transportation system, and is served along its entire length by MTA Regional Bus Operations' Q10 bus route. The New York City Subway's Kew Gardens–Union Turnpike station, at the boulevard's north end, is served by the IND Queens Boulevard Line. The BMT Jamaica Line crosses Lefferts Boulevard at Jamaica Avenue, with the closest station being one block east at 121st Street, and the IND Fulton Street Line stops at the Ozone Park–Lefferts Boulevard station at Liberty Avenue. The AirTrain JFK has a stop at Lefferts Boulevard near the south end of the road.

References

Streets in Queens, New York
Lefferts family